is a Japanese politician, journalist, historian, social critic and biographer of literary figures such as Yukio Mishima and Osamu Dazai. He served as Lieutenant Governor of Tokyo from June 2007 until becoming Acting Governor on 1 November 2012 following the resignation of Shintaro Ishihara. He was elected Governor in a historical landslide victory in December 2012, but announced his resignation on December 19, 2013, following a political funds-related scandal; his resignation was approved and became effective December 24, 2013.

Early life 
Inose was born in Nagano Prefecture; his father died of angina when Inose was three years old. He attended elementary and junior high schools affiliated with Shinshu University, and ultimately enrolled at Shinshu in 1966. He graduated from Shinshu University in 1970 and moved to Tokyo, where he was married later in the year. He enrolled in graduate school for political science at Meiji University in 1972, and had two children, born in 1974 and 1978.

Career as author 
During the International Military Tribunal for the Far East, the Institute would be accused of being part of Japan's militaristic machine, but Inose asserts that it was little more than a think-tank, of which the purpose was to examine dispassionately the consequences of a total war. Its conclusion was that "there [would] be no way for Japan to win the war because of its clear material inferiority. The war [would] be drawn out. The Soviet Union [would] butt in, and Japan [would] be defeated. Therefore, going to war with the United States must absolutely be avoided."

In 2009, his 1993 book  was published in English. In 2012, Inose's 1995 biography of Mishima was published in English under the title Persona: A Biography of Yukio Mishima, edited and adapted by Hiroaki Sato and published by Stone Bridge Press.

Inose's examination of public affairs led him to bitter criticisms of Japan's ruling classes and their reluctance to enact reform. His longstanding proposal was for the privatisation of the four public highway corporations, and reform of the postal savings system that finances them. As a result, he joined Prime Minister Junichirō Koizumi's taskforce and served on the commission to examine the Japan Highway Public Corporation (Nihon Doro Kodan). His insistence that cuts be made was so uncompromising that some other appointees declined positions on the board.

Inose said that Japan lost World War II because the government at the time ignored data suggesting Japan would be unable to defeat the Allies and forbade access to the information before Tokyo declared war in 1941. He has further argued that this action is being repeated today by bureaucrats with respect to the economy. He advocated that people share accurate information with respect to Japan's economic situation, that is not necessarily issued by bureaucrats, in efforts to help a debt-ridden Japan. He claims that "any reform can be implemented if people share more accurate and objective data than that (initially) released by authorities."

Political career 

On 15 June 2007, Governor Shintaro Ishihara announced that Inose had agreed to serve as a lietenant governor for the capital stating that "our opinions might differ but I believe it is healthy for us to debate and discuss many of our differences." Inose was initially at odds with LDP lawmakers in the metropolitan assembly during confirmation hearings, and shortly thereafter overturned an LDP-sponsored urban redevelopment initiative, although Ishihara later pressured Inose to cooperate with the LDP lawmakers.

Upon his resignation in 2012, Governor Ishihara designated Inose as his interim successor; Inose was elected as governor of Tokyo in the 2012 Tokyo gubernatorial election with the largest number of votes in Tokyo history. His platform included reform of the Tokyo Electric Power Company and the merger of Tokyo Metro with the Tokyo Metropolitan Bureau of Transportation subway network, although he made minimal progress with either issue following his election.

Role in Olympic bid 

As governor, Inose served as the Chairman of Tokyo's successful bid for the 2020 Summer Olympics. He attended the 2012 Summer Olympics in London in order to launch Tokyo's campaign for the Games.

He created controversy in April 2013 when he made a comment that was seen as a criticism of the Muslim world, as well as Istanbul and their bid for the 2020 Olympics: "Well, compare the two countries where they have yet to build infrastructure, very sophisticated facilities. So from time to time, like Brazil, I think it’s good to have a venue for the first time. But Islamic countries, the only thing they share in common is Allah and they are fighting with each other and they have classes." Criticizing rival bids is forbidden under IOC rules; following Inose's statement, Tokyo 2020 made a statement saying that they "have the utmost respect for all candidate cities and have always taken pride in bidding in a spirit based on the Olympic values of excellence, respect and friendship.”  Inose apologized for his comments a few days later and stated that he was "fully committed" to respecting IOC rules. Japan later won its bid for the Olympics under Inose's chairmanship.

Money scandal and resignation 
In November 2013, Inose became embroiled in a scandal concerning cash he received from the Tokushukai hospital group led by Torao Takuda, father of Lower House member Takeshi Tokuda. Inose claimed to have borrowed 50 million yen as a personal loan from Tokushukai, delivered to him in cash in exchange for a written IOU in November 2012, and that he repaid the loan in cash in September 2013. The loan was interest and collateral-free, and the funds were kept in a safe deposit box rather than in a bank account, without being reported to Japanese campaign finance authorities as part of Inose's assets.

The Tokyo Metropolitan Government Assembly conducted four days of public questioning of Inose in December, over the course of which Inose's recollection of events changed in several respects. The Assembly then established a special committee to investigate Inose, the first incidence of the assembly formally investigating a governor.

The Asahi Shimbun called for Inose's resignation in an editorial on December 12, while the Mainichi Shimbun called him "no longer viable" as a governor on the same day. A Sankei Shimbun poll released on December 16 found that 89% of Tokyo respondents thought that Inose's explanation of the funds was not credible, while 63% thought he was no longer an appropriate representative of Tokyo as an Olympic host city.

Inose announced his resignation as governor on December 19, 2013, following direct pressure from various senior political figures including ex-Governor Ishihara and Prime Minister Shinzō Abe. In his resignation speech, he characterized himself as an "amateur" at politics and expressed hope "that our next governor will be a real political pro who can guide Tokyo successfully through the Olympics." He expressed his desire to continue writing following his resignation as governor. The Tokyo Metropolitan Assembly approved and formalized his resignation on December 24.

Inose was succeeded as interim governor by Vice Governor Tatsumi Ando. His term of office as governor was the shortest in Tokyo history at only 372 days. Yōichi Masuzoe won the February 2014 election to determine Inose's final successor as governor. In June 2016 Masuzoe also stepped down after a money scandal.

Personal life 
Inose is a runner who jogs every day, and completed the 2012 Tokyo Marathon. He also holds a black belt in judo.

Publications

English translated works

Japanese-language works

References

External links 
 Official profile in English
 Photograph of Naoki's appointment as Vice Governor

1946 births
Living people
Governors of Tokyo
Japanese biographers
Japanese critics
20th-century Japanese historians
Japanese journalists
People from Nagano Prefecture
Shintaro Ishihara
Yukio Mishima
20th-century biographers
Shinshu University alumni
Meiji University alumni